Anthaxia nitidula is a species of jewel beetles belonging to the family Buprestidae, subfamily Buprestinae.

Description
The male is completely metallic green, while the head and pronotum in the female are red and elytra are green. Main host plants of the wood-boring larvae are in the genera Amygdalus, Crataegus and Prunus.

Distribution
This beetle is present in most of Europe, in the eastern Palearctic realm, in the Near East, and in North Africa.

Subspecies
Anthaxia nitidula nitidula (Linnaeus, 1758)
Anthaxia nitidula signaticollis (Krynicky, 1832)

Gallery

References

Buprestidae
Beetles of Europe
Beetles described in 1758
Taxa named by Carl Linnaeus